Fatou is the debut album from Malian musician Fatoumata Diawara. Uncut placed the album at number 34 on its list of "Top 50 albums of 2011", The Sunday Times named it number 1 world music album in the 2011 end of year polls and WMCE voted it 2011 album of the year.

The album was recorded following a successful acting career and tours as a backing singer with Diawara's mentor Oumou Sangaré, who brought her to the attention of World Circuit Records and to whom the song, "Makoun Oumou" is dedicated. Sung in the Malian language Wassoulou and backing herself on guitar, Diawara explores themes of war, abandonment of children and female circumcision (Boloko) supported by contributions from West African virtuosi Tony Allen (drums) and Toumani Diabaté (kora) as well as Led Zeppelin bassist John Paul Jones.

Track listing

References

2011 debut albums
Fatoumata Diawara albums